Thakurdwara is one of the 403 Legislative Assembly constituencies of Uttar Pradesh state in India.

It is part of Moradabad district.

Members of Legislative Assembly

Election results

2022

2017

See also
 List of constituencies of the Uttar Pradesh Legislative Assembly
 Moradabad district
 Sahaspur

Notes

References

External links
 Official site of Legislature in Uttar Pradesh
 Uttar Pradesh Government website
 UP Assembly
 

Assembly constituencies of Uttar Pradesh
Moradabad district